Share may refer to:
 Share, to make joint use of a resource (such as food, money, or space); see Sharing
 Share (finance), a stock or other financial security (such as a mutual fund)
 Share, Kwara, a town and LGA in Kwara State, Nigeria

Share may also refer to:

Arts, entertainment, and media
 Share (2015 film), a short drama film
 Share (2019 film), a feature drama film
 Share (newspaper), a newspaper in Toronto, Canada
 Ratings share, percentage of television sets in use tuned to a program, according to the Nielsen Ratings

Computing
 share (command), a shell command
 SHARE (computing), a user group for IBM mainframe computers
 Share (P2P), a Japanese P2P computer program, the successor to Winny
 Share, a software service of Acrobat.com used for sending files
 File sharing
 Network share, a file storage area that is available over a computer network
 Share icon, a user interface icon intended to convey performing a share action
 SHARE Operating System, the first operating system, by the SHARE user group

Organizations 
 SHARE cancer support, a New York City organization supporting women with cancer
 SHARE Foundation (El Salvador), an El Salvador justice organization
 Share Foundation, a medical charity in Newfoundland
 SHARE in Africa, an American charity organization
 Share International, a religious movement founded by British painter Benjamin Creme
 Skeptics and Humanist Aid and Relief Effort, or SHARE, a charity arm of the Center for Inquiry
 Students Harness Aid for the Relief of the Elderly, or SHARE, a charity in Cork, Ireland

Other uses
 Southern Hemisphere Auroral Radar Experiment, or SHARE, tracking space weather from Antarctica
 Survey of Health, Ageing and Retirement in Europe, or SHARE, a health and social study in Europe

See also
 
 
 Cher (disambiguation)
 Plowshare, the cutting blade of a plow (plough)
 Ridesharing (disambiguation)
 Shared (disambiguation)
 Timeshare (disambiguation)